Ibrahim Geagea (23 March 1924 – 30 July 1985) was a Lebanese alpine skier. He competed at the 1948, 1952, 1956 and the 1960 Winter Olympics.

References

1924 births
1985 deaths
Lebanese male alpine skiers
Olympic alpine skiers of Lebanon
Alpine skiers at the 1948 Winter Olympics
Alpine skiers at the 1952 Winter Olympics
Alpine skiers at the 1956 Winter Olympics
Alpine skiers at the 1960 Winter Olympics